Gmina Łagów may refer to either of the following rural administrative districts in Poland:
Gmina Łagów, Świętokrzyskie Voivodeship
Gmina Łagów, Lubusz Voivodeship